RAON is a South Korean particle physics laboratory within the Rare Isotope Science Project (RISP) that is being constructed in the outskirts of Daejeon neighboring Sejong, South Korea by the Institute for Basic Science (IBS). It was expected to be finished by 2021 before getting pushed back to 2025.

Name 
The name Rare isotope Accelerator complex for ON-line experiment or RAON, was selected through a contest open to the public in 2012. RAON comes from the Korean word   meaning "happy" or "joyful". Among 639 entries, the winning name was actually Raonhaje (라온하제) meaning "happy tomorrow" but was shortened for easier pronunciation. RAON is also the name of their chemical element mascot with atomic number 41 and niobium written on the stomach.

Type 
RAON is a heavy ion particle accelerator that will include both isotope separation on-line (ISOL) and in-flight fragmentation (IF) methods, and aims to be the first to use both. The superconducting linear accelerator will have a maximum beam power of 400 kW, and projectile fragmentation will be powered by a 200 MeV/u uranium beam in the IF system. The ISOL system will have a H- cyclotron  of 70 kW.

Due to the complexity of the project, RAON's researchers are working in collaboration with a number of other accelerator research groups, including CERN, Fermilab, TRIUMF, and Riken.

The cost is estimated at 1.4523 trillion KRW (roughly US$1.4 billion) in which 460.2 billion KRW is for device construction, 635 billion KRW for facility construction, and 357.1 billion KRW for land purchase. The size of the site is 652,066 m2 with a total floor area of 130,144 m2. In additional to the primary accelerator site under construction in Shindong (신동), RISP has the ISOL Off-line Test Facility in Yuseong-gu,  Superconducting Radio Frequency test facility in KAIST's Munji Campus, and the Accelerator and ICT Building in Korea University Sejong Campus.

Research

Nuclear science 
Research areas in the field of nuclear science include the study of the origin of elements and evolution of stars, nuclear force and structure, nuclear reactions, and nuclear science theory. 
 KOrea Broad acceptance Recoil spectrometer and Apparatus (KOBRA): Study the production of nuclear structures and rare isotopes through the collisions of nuclei of rare isotopes and stable atoms
 Large Acceptance Multi-Purpose Spectrometer (LAMPS): Observe the high density states of substances resulting from collisions of neutron-rich rare isotopes
 Nuclear Data Production System (NDPS): Produce precise atomic nuclear reaction data on rare isotope nuclear materials and high-speed neutrons

Physical science
The group aims to develop an ultra-sensitive device for measuring the physical properties of muons, and study the properties of new materials, including semiconductors, nano-magnetic materials, high-temperature superconductors, and topological insulators. 
 Muon Spin Relaxation (μSR): Use muons to research superconductivity, nano-magnetism, and topological insulation through measuring local electromagnetic properties

Atomic and molecular science
In these fields, they aim to precisely measure rare isotope mass and develop atomic manipulation technology, develop micro-measurement technology for atomic structures, and find the precise measurements of basic physical constants. 
 Mass Measurement System (MMS): Categorize rare isotopes and find new atoms through precise mass measurements
 Collinear Laser Spectroscopy (CLS): Categorize rare isotopes and know their nuclear characteristics through the changes in their shapes and atomic energy levels

Biomedical science
Research the application of rare isotopes in cancer treatment.
 Beam Irradiation System (BIS): Develop biomedical techniques for cancer treatment by exposing biological tissue samples to heavy-ion or rare isotope beams to selectively destroy cells and modify DNA

Timeline
2009: The National Science and Technology Council confirms the International Science and Business Belt plans, which include RISP.
2010: The heavy-ion accelerator pre-planning study was completed in June.
2011: A conceptual design study was completed in February. In December, the Rare Isotope Science Project officially launched.
2012: The basic plan to establish RAON was completed
2013: In June the technical design report for RAON was completed and the basic plan to establish RAON was modified.
2014: The basic plan was confirmed in May and the facility construction plan commenced in December.
2015: The basic plan was modified in April and the facility construction plan was completed in December.
2018: RAON installation begins
2020: Completion of building construction
2025: Completion of RAON construction

See also 

Facility for Rare Isotope Beams
On-Line Isotope Mass Separator
Facility for Antiproton and Ion Research
GSI Helmholtz Centre for Heavy Ion Research
PANDA experiment

References

External links
  (English and Korean)
  (Korean)

Particle physics facilities
Daejeon
Institute for Basic Science
Research institutes established in 2011
2011 establishments in South Korea
Research institutes in South Korea